Frederick Bernard Roos (November 22, 1883 – May 13, 1942) was an American lawyer and businessman.

Biography
Roos was born in Chicago, Illinois. Roos was admitted to the Illinois bar in 1905 and practiced law in Chicago. Roos was also involved with the banking business. He lived in Forest Park, Illinois with his wife and family. Roos served in the Illinois House of Representatives from 1907 to 1909 and from 1911 to 1915. He also served in the Illinois Senate from 1915 to 1927. Roos was a Republican. Roos died at his home in Forest Park, Illinois.

In 1923, Roos unsuccessfully ran for the Superior Court of Cook County.

References

External links

1883 births
1942 deaths
Businesspeople from Chicago
Lawyers from Chicago
Politicians from Chicago
People from Forest Park, Illinois
Republican Party members of the Illinois House of Representatives
Republican Party Illinois state senators
20th-century American politicians
20th-century American businesspeople
20th-century American lawyers